Jeong Sun-ja (born 8 August 1947) is a South Korean diver. She competed in the women's 10 metre platform event at the 1964 Summer Olympics.

References 

1947 births
Living people
South Korean female divers
Olympic divers of South Korea
Divers at the 1964 Summer Olympics
Place of birth missing (living people)
20th-century South Korean women